C59 may refer to:
 , an Admirable-class minesweeper of the Mexican Navy
 Caldwell 59, a planetary nebula
 Caudron C.59, a French, two-seat biplane
 , a Fiji-class light cruiser of the Royal Navy
 JNR Class C59, a Japanese steam locomotive
 Lake Lawn Airport in Walworth County, Wisconsin
 Lockheed C-59 Lodestar, an American military aircraft
 Minimum Age (Industry) Convention (Revised), 1937 of the International Labour Organization
 Two Knights Defense, a chess opening